Perreault is a surname of French origin, and may refer to:

In sport

Hockey
 Bob Perreault (1931–1980), Canadian professional ice hockey player
 Gilbert Perreault (born 1950), Canadian professional ice hockey centre
 Jacob Perreault (born 2002), Canadian professional ice hockey player
 Mathieu Perreault (born 1988), Canadian professional ice hockey centre
 Yanic Perreault (born 1971), Canadian professional ice hockey player

Other sports
 Annie Perreault (born 1971), Canadian short track speed skater
 Dominique Perreault (born 1984), Canadian water polo player
 Pete Perreault (born 1939), American football guard

Other
Guillaume Perreault (born 1985), Canadian writer, illustrator
 Robert Perreault (born 1947), Canadian politician